Dwe'e may refer to:
Dwe'e people, an ethnic group of southeastern Cameroon
Dwe'e language, the language of the Dwe'e and Nzime people